Jiangcheng is a district of Yangjiang, Guangdong province, China.

County-level divisions of Guangdong
Yangjiang